Bete Amhara (Amharic: ቤተ አማራ,  Ge'ez: ቤተ ዐምሐራ, translation: "House of Amhara") is a historical region that is located in north central Ethiopia. It covered most of Ethiopia's Wollo Province, along with significant parts of north Shewa, Gojjam, and later, it encompassed Gonder. The state had 30 districts, including Ambassel, Lakomelza, Laikueyta, Tatakuyeta, Akamba, Ambassit, Atronsa Mariam, Genete, Feresbahir (most probably located in the northern part of Dessie, where there is a small lake called Feres Bahir or Bahir Shasho), Amba Gishen, Gishe Bere, Wasal, Wagada, Mecana-Selasse, Tabor, Tedbaba Mariam,  Zoramba, Daje, Demah, Ephrata and Ewarza. The region is the source of much of Ethiopia's clothing culture, eating culture, language, and education.

History 
 
The 13th-14th century hagiography of Amhara saint Tekle Haymanot traces Bete Amhara as far back as the mid 9th century AD as a location. With the rise of the Solomonic Dynasty in 1270 under Emperor Yekuno Amlak, and until the establishment of Gondar as the new imperial capital around 1600, the Debre-Birhan to Mekane-Selassie region (Werillu in Wollo) was the primary seat of the roving Welloye-Shewan emperors. This period is most significant in the formation of the medieval Ethiopian state, the spread and consolidation of Ethiopian Orthodox Christianity (following the example set by the Zagwe kings in preserving the Axumite heritage) and propagating to the core provinces (besides Tigray, Wolkayt, and Lasta) of Bete Amhara, Gojjam, Begemdir, northern Shewa, Gafat, and Damot

The region’s recorded history, in fact, goes back to the first decades of the second millennium. For example, St. George’s Church in the town of Woreilu (whose Tabot is reputed to have been carried by Emperor Menelik at the Battle of Adwa) was established around 1200. The parish of Mekane Selassie (መካነ ሥላሴ), near Neded and the home of the famous cathedral by the same name, served as a favorite royal playground. The construction of Mekane Selassie (meaning: the abode of the Trinity) was begun by Emperor Naod (1494-1508) and completed by his son Emperor Libna Dengel (royal nom-du-guerre, Wanag Seged). This was a year before the church (along with a large number of monasteries in the region) was sacked in 1531 by a destructive Ottoman-backed invasion. Francisco Alvarez, who had earlier visited the church, confirms that its size was some 150 feet by 150 feet—wholly covered in gold leaf, inlaid with gems, pearls and corals. Astounded by the wealth and workmanship, the Yemeni chronicler of Ahmed Gragn notes: "The imam asked all the Arabs who were with him, ‘Is there the like of this church, with its images and its gold, in Byzantium, or in India, or in any other place?' They replied, ‘We never saw or heard of its like in Byzantium or India or anywhere in the world.

Due to the origin of the Solomonic Dynasty in Bete Amhara, the regions rulers played a disproportionate role  in the politics of the Ethiopian state. In the medieval era, the Tsahife Lam (ጻሕፈ ላም), governor of the Bete Amhara province, was the most senior military officer next to the Emperor. Along with that, the Jantirar of Ambassel (the center of Bete Amhara and lordship of Yekuno Amlak himself prior to his ascension as Emperor of Ethiopia), was tasked with protecting Amba Geshen. One of the mountains of Ethiopia where most of the male heirs to the Solomonic Dynasty were interned, the Emperors also kept the imperial treasury there even after it was no longer a royal prison.

Geography and ethnography 
The Bete-Amhara districts included:

Geshen
Ambassel (including Amba Gishen)
Ambassit
Akamba
Atronsa Mariam
Daje
 Demah
 Ephrata 
Ewarza.
Feresbahir (most probably located in the northern part of Dessie, where there is a small lake called Feres Bahir or Bahir Shasho)
Genete
 Gishe Bere
 Lakomelza 
 Laikueyta
 Mecana-Selasse
 Tabor
Tatakuyeta 
 Tedbaba Mariam  
 Zoramba
Wagada 
 Wasal

Cities 
The historic and modern cities found in the province include:

 Ankober
 Debre Berhan 
 Debre Tabor
 Kombolcha
 Weldiya
 Amba Mariam
Hayq 
 Debre Sina
 Mekane Selassie 
 Mekane Selam
 Were Ilu
 Kobo

Culture 

The region is the source of much of Ethiopia's clothing culture, eating culture, language, education system. Abba Gregorius (1596-1658), the famous monk whose Jesuit association and global travels disseminated invaluable knowledge overseas about Ethiopia, is said to hail from Woreilu. In a 1650 letter to the German scholar Hiob Ludolf (1624-1704), the Ethiopologist deservedly known as the father of Ethiopian Studies, Abba Gregorius describes himself as follows:

"As to my origins, do not imagine, my friend, that they are humble, for I am of the House of Amhara which is a respected tribe; from it come the heads of the Ethiopian people, the governors, the military commanders, the judges and the advisers of the King of Ethiopia who appoint and dismiss, command and rule in the name of the King, his governors, and grandees.”

Religion 
The dominant religion of the province was Christianity, in the form of Ethiopian Orthodoxy. As the state religion, the Ethiopian Orthodox Tewahedo Church played a critical role in the development of the province as a whole.

See also
 Amhara people
 Amhara Province
 Amhara Region

References

Regions of Ethiopia